Lisandro Alonso (born 2 June 1975) is an Argentine film director and screenwriter. He has directed six feature-length films and a short film since 2001 and is loosely associated with the New Argentine Cinema movement.  His film La libertad was screened in the Un Certain Regard section at the 2001 Cannes Film Festival. His 2014 film Jauja competed in the Un Certain Regard section at the 2014 Cannes Film Festival, where it won the FIPRESCI Prize.  In addition, he was named Film Society of Lincoln Center 2014 Filmmaker in Residence on 24 June 2014.

Filmography
 Dos en la vereda - 1995
 Freedom (La libertad) - 2001
 Los muertos - 2004
 Fantasma - 2006
 Liverpool - 2008
 Untitled (Letter to Serra) (Sin título (Carta para Serra) - 2011
 Jauja - 2014

References

External links

1975 births
Living people
People from Buenos Aires
Argentine film directors
Argentine screenwriters
Male screenwriters
Argentine male writers
Argentine film editors
Argentine film producers